The 1981 European Cup Winners' Cup Final was a football match contested on 13 May 1981 between Dinamo Tbilisi of the Soviet Union and Carl Zeiss Jena of East Germany. It was the final game of the 1980–81 European Cup Winners' Cup, and the 21st European Cup Winners' Cup final, held at Rheinstadion in Düsseldorf, West Germany. Only 4,750 people attended the match, though some sources claim there were 9,000 people. Dinamo Tbilisi won the match 2–1 thanks to goals by Vladimir Gutsaev and Vitaly Daraselia.

Road to the final

Match

Details

See also
1981 European Cup Final
1981 UEFA Cup Final

References

External links
1981 European Cup Winners' Cup Final at Rec.Sport.Soccer Statistics Foundation

3
FC Dinamo Tbilisi matches
FC Carl Zeiss Jena matches
International club association football competitions hosted by Germany
1981
1980–81 in East German football
1981 in Soviet football
May 1981 sports events in Europe
1981 in West German sport
1980s in Düsseldorf
Football in North Rhine-Westphalia
Sports competitions in Düsseldorf